Urs may refer to:
Urs, the death anniversary of a Sufi saint in South Asia
Urs, Ariège, a commune in southern France
Urs (Forever Knight), a fictional character from the television series Forever Knight
Urs (given name)
Urs (surname), an Indian surname
D. Devaraj Urs, a politician from the state of Karnataka, India

URS may refer to:
The ISO 3166-1 3-letter country code for the former Soviet Union
The IOC country code for the former Soviet Union
United Regions of Serbia (Ujedinjeni regioni Srbije), a political coalition and later a political party in Serbia
The University of Rizal System, Philippines
Robert Schuman University (in French, Université Robert Schuman or URS)
Roma Union of Serbia (Unija roma Srbije), a political party in Serbia
URS Corporation, a U.S.-based engineering services firm
User requirements specification, in systems engineering
Universal Rating System for chess players

See also 
 Ursu (surname), a Romanian surname